Rachael Kirkconnell (born September 26, 1996) is an American television personality, who is best known as the winner of season 25 of The Bachelor.

Early life and education

Kirkconnell was born and raised in Cumming, Georgia to parents Darrell and Kim Kirkconnell. She has a sister, Trinity, and a brother, Greyson. She is of Honduran descent on her father's side. She graduated from West Forsyth High School in 2015, and then from Georgia College & State University in 2019 with a degree in marketing. While in college, she was a member of Alpha Delta Pi, but left the sorority after attending a controversial Antebellum South plantation themed formal. 

Prior to appearing on The Bachelor, Kirkconnell was working as a graphic designer in Atlanta, Georgia.

The Bachelor

Kirkconnell was a contestant on Matt James' season of The Bachelor. James, who was the first African American male lead in the show's history, chose her over fellow finalist Michelle Young. However, he did not propose.

During the live After the Final Rose special in March 2021, it was revealed that James had made the decision to end his relationship with Kirkconnell after her racially insensitive past was brought to light.

Controversy

While James' season was airing, Kirkconnell came under fire after she was accused of several racist actions, including liking racist social media posts and bullying girls in high school for their dating preferences. James was forced to address these allegations after a photo of Kirkconnell attending an Antebellum South plantation themed fraternity formal in 2018 went viral.

In February 2021, Kirkconnell issued a public apology for her past behavior, calling her actions "ignorant and racist" and pleaded with people not to defend her.

Personal life
Kirkconnell and James broke up while their season was airing, but got back together in April 2021.

References

External links

1996 births
Living people
Bachelor Nation contestants
Georgia College & State University alumni
People from Cumming, Georgia